The following is a list of notable deaths in July 2022.

Entries for each day are listed alphabetically by surname. A typical entry lists information in the following sequence:
 Name, age, country of citizenship at birth, subsequent country of citizenship (if applicable), reason for notability, cause of death (if known), and reference.

July 2022

1
Carla Bazzanella, 74, Italian linguist.
Angela Bonallack, 85, English amateur golfer.
Eddie Brooks, 72, Australian Olympic water polo player (1976).
Drew Busby, 74, Scottish footballer (Airdrieonians, Hearts, Toronto Blizzard).
Irene Fargo, 59, Italian singer and stage actress.
Edward Feiner, 75, American architect, brain cancer.
Pedro Pablo García Caffi, 77, Argentine musician and singer.
Raul Nicolau Gonçalves, 95, Indian Roman Catholic prelate, auxiliary bishop (1967–1978) and archbishop (1978–2003) of Goa and Daman, patriarch of the East Indies (1978–2003).
Árni Gunnarsson, 82, Icelandic journalist and politician.
Joe Hatton, 74, Puerto Rican Olympic basketball player (1968, 1972).
Peter Imre, 60, Romanian businessman, cancer.
Yuri Khaliullin, 78, Russian naval officer.
Bob King, 87, Australian lawn bowler.
Tjahjo Kumolo, 64, Indonesian politician, twice MP, minister of home affairs (2014–2019) and bureaucratic reform (since 2019), multiple organ failure.
Stanislav Leonovich, 63, Russian Olympic figure skater (1980).
Alan McCleery, 93, Canadian Olympic sprint canoeist (1960).
Dermot O'Neill, 58, Irish gardener and journalist.
Gary Pearson, 45, English football player (York City, Darlington) and manager (Crook Town).
Maurizio Pradeaux, 91, Italian film director (Death Carries a Cane, Death Steps in the Dark, Churchill's Leopards) and screenwriter.
Luis Alberto Rodríguez López-Calleja, 62, Cuban military officer, businessman, and politician, heart attack.
Rainer Scholz, 67, German football player (Hannover 96, Waldhof Mannheim) and manager (Darmstadt 98).
Reanna Solomon, 40, Nauruan Olympic weightlifter (2004), COVID-19.
George R. Stotser, 87, American lieutenant general.
Richard Taruskin, 77, American musicologist (Oxford History of Western Music), esophageal cancer.
Roger Tighe, 77, English boxer.

2
David Blackwood, 80, Canadian visual artist.
Peter Brook, 97, English theatre and film director (Lord of the Flies, Ride of the Valkyrie, Marat/Sade), Tony winner (1966, 1971).
Mick Crane, 69, British rugby league player (Hull, Leeds Rhinos, national team).
Alain de Cadenet, 76, English racing driver and television presenter (Legends of Motorsport, Victory by Design), bile duct cancer.
Susana Dosamantes, 74, Mexican actress (Rio Lobo, Day of the Assassin, El Juramento), pancreatic cancer.
Miguel Etchecolatz, 93, Argentine police officer (National Reorganization Process) and convicted mass murderer (Night of the Pencils).
Jane Garrett, 49, Australian politician, Victorian MLA (2010–2018) and MLC (since 2018), mayor of Yarra (2009–2010), breast cancer.
Walter Goldbeck, 77, German politician, member of the Landtag of Mecklenburg-Vorpommern (1990–1994).
Andy Goram, 58, Scottish footballer (Oldham Athletic, Rangers, national team), esophageal cancer.
Ed Hindson, 77, American televangelist and academic (Liberty University). 
Francisco Huerta Montalvo, 82, Ecuadorian doctor and politician, mayor of Guayaquil (1970), minister of public health (1982–1983) and of the interior (2000), heart attack.
Doreen Hume, 95, Canadian operatic soprano.
Brian Jackson, 91, British actor (Carry On Sergeant, Some Like It Cool, Revenge of the Pink Panther), cancer.
Dmitry Kolker, 54, Russian physicist, pancreatic cancer.
Alex Law, 69, Hong Kong film director (Painted Faces, Echoes of the Rainbow) and screenwriter (An Autumn's Tale), heart attack.
Peter Lee, 84, American Episcopal prelate, bishop of Virginia (1985–2009).
Ryan Leone, 36, American novelist and prison reform activist.
Anne Neville, 52, British engineer.
Laurent Noël, 102, Canadian Roman Catholic prelate, auxiliary bishop of Quebec (1963–1975) and bishop of Trois-Rivières (1975–1996).
Jim Van Pelt, 86, American football player (Michigan Wolverines, Winnipeg Blue Bombers).
Jeffrey Plale, 54, American politician, Wisconsin Railroad commissioner (2011–2016), member of the Wisconsin State Assembly (1996–2003) and Senate (2003–2011).
Mike Reynolds, 92, American voice actor (Akira, Castle in the Sky, VR Troopers).
Saúl Rivero, 67, Uruguayan football player (Atlético Español, national team) and manager (Progreso).
Leonid Shvartsman, 101, Russian animator (Cheburashka, 38 Parrots, The Scarlet Flower).
Roland Stănescu, 32, Romanian footballer (Petrolul Ploiești, FC Argeș), suicide by jumping.
Susie Steiner, 51, British novelist and journalist (The Guardian), brain cancer.
Félix Tonye Mbog, 88, Cameroonian politician, minister of foreign affairs (1983–1984).
John Watson, 73, American football player (San Francisco 49ers, New Orleans Saints).
Spider Webb, 78, American tattoo artist, chronic obstructive pulmonary disease.

3
Irving Abella, 82, Canadian labour and Judaism historian (None Is Too Many).
Clifford Alexander Jr., 88, American lawyer, secretary of the Army (1977–1981).
Joseph Banowetz, 87, American classical pianist and pedagogue.
Idelisa Bonnelly, 90, Dominican marine biologist.
Liliana Caldini, 70, Argentine model, actress and television host.
Len Casey, 91, English footballer (Plymouth Argyle, Chelsea).
Miu Chu, 40, Taiwanese singer, breast cancer.
Islay Conolly, 99, Caymanian school administrator.
Robert Curl, 88, American chemist, Nobel prize laureate (1996).
Eoin Farrell, 40, Irish Gaelic footballer (Westmeath GAA).
Clément Fayat, 90, French construction executive (Fayat Group).
Fernando García de Cortázar, 79, Spanish priest and historian.
Robb Hanrahan, 60, American journalist (WHP-TV).
Lennart Hjulström, 83, Swedish actor (My Life as a Dog, Codename Coq Rouge, The Girl Who Kicked the Hornets' Nest) and director.
Soila Komi, 79, Finnish actress.
Nikolai Kostechko, 75, Russian military and intelligence officer, Hero of the Russian Federation (2000), chief of staff and first deputy director of the GRU.
Judy Barrett Litoff, 77, American editor and author, complications following surgery.
Jack Monaghan, 100, New Zealand amateur wrestler.
Ni Kuang, 87, Hong Kong screenwriter (One-Armed Swordsman, Fist of Fury, The Seventh Curse) and novelist, skin cancer.
Barry Ronge, 74, South African film critic and author.
Sérgio Paulo Rouanet, 88, Brazilian diplomat, minister of culture (1991–1992).
Dave Shearer, 63, Scottish footballer (Middlesbrough, Gillingham).
Sergey Sosnovsky, 67, Russian actor (To Live, Metro, The Factory).
Leandro Soto, 66, Cuban-American artist, cancer.
Earlie Thomas, 76, American football player (New York Jets, Denver Broncos).
Gavin Thorley, 75, New Zealand Olympic long-distance runner (1972).
Charles Wesley Turnbull, 87, American politician, governor of the United States Virgin Islands (1999–2007).

4
Khairy Alzahaby, 76, Syrian novelist and historian.
Richard J. Bernstein, 90, American philosopher.
Alan Blaikley, 82, English songwriter ("Have I the Right?", "The Legend of Xanadu", "I've Lost You") and composer.
Elena Bodnarenco, 57, Moldovan politician, three-term deputy, and mayor of Soroca (2011–2015), cancer.
Remco Campert, 92, Dutch writer.
Bailey Doogan, 80, American painter.
Hubert Erang, 91, Luxembourgian Olympic gymnast (1952, 1960).
Jeremiah Farrell, 84, American mathematician.
Gabriel Fourmigué, 55, French Olympic bobsledder (1992, 1994), shot.
Hank Goldberg, 82, American sports journalist (WQAM, ESPN), kidney disease.
Miguel González, 83, Spanish Olympic basketball player (1960).
Paolo Grossi, 89, Italian jurist, judge (2009–2018) and president (2016–2018) of the Constitutional Court.
Mona Hammond, 91, Jamaican-British actress (EastEnders, Desmond's, Us Girls).
Robert Hoffmann, 82, Austrian actor (The Adventures of Robinson Crusoe, Kampf um Rom, The Sea Wolves).
Cláudio Hummes, 87, Brazilian Roman Catholic cardinal, archbishop of Fortaleza (1996–1998) and São Paulo (1998–2006), prefect for the Clergy (2006–2010).
Janusz Kupcewicz, 66, Polish football player (Arka Gdynia, Lech Poznań, national team) and manager, stroke.
Toto Landero, 26, Filipino boxer, drowned.
Betty Levin, 94, American writer.
Tarun Majumdar, 91, Indian film director (Balika Badhu, Kuheli, Shriman Prithviraj).
Mac McLendon, 76, American golfer (PGA Tour).
Clive Middlemass, 77, English football player (Leeds United, Workington) and manager (Carlisle United).
Ronald Moon, 81, American judge, associate (1990–1993) and chief justice (1993–2010) of the Supreme Court of Hawaii.
Kunihiko Saitō, 87, Japanese politician and diplomat, ambassador to the United States (1995–1999), prostate cancer.
Russell Stannard, 90, British physicist.
Aleksei Sveshnikov, 97, Russian mathematical physicist.
Kazuki Takahashi, 60, Japanese manga artist (Yu-Gi-Oh!), drowned.
Patrick Watson, 92, Canadian broadcaster.

5
Arne Åhman, 97, Swedish triple jumper, Olympic champion (1948).
Mohammed Barkindo, 63, Nigerian politician, secretary general of OPEC (since 2016).
David Beetham, 83-84, British social theorist.
Lisetta Carmi, 98, Italian photographer.
Manny Charlton, 80, Scottish rock guitarist (Nazareth).
Lenny Von Dohlen, 63, American actor (Twin Peaks, Electric Dreams, Home Alone 3).
Cacho Fontana, 90, Argentine broadcaster.
Elizabeth Grant, 58, Australian anthropologist.
Joe Hueglin, 85, Canadian politician, MP (1972–1974).
Ho Wang Lee, 93, South Korean virologist and epidemiologist.
Alfred Koerppen, 95, German organist and composer.
Maurice Lamoureux, 88, Canadian politician, mayor of Sudbury (1981–1982).
P. Gopinathan Nair, 99, Indian social worker and independence activist, complications from COVID-19.
Binette Schroeder, 82, German author and illustrator.
Subramaniam Sinniah, 77, Malaysian politician, MP (1974–1978, 1982–2004), complications from ruptured aneurysm.
José Vicente, 100, Puerto Rican Olympic pole vaulter (1948, 1952).

6
Masashi Aoyagi, 65, Japanese karateka and professional wrestler (FMW, NJPW, NOAH).
Joe Barry, 90, Irish television executive.
Ed Bauta, 87, Cuban baseball player (St. Louis Cardinals, New York Mets).
James Caan, 82, American actor (The Godfather, Thief, Misery), heart attack.
Jacqueline Challet-Haas, 87, French dancer and professor.
Tony Comber, 95, English clergyman, archdeacon of Leeds (1982–1992).
Lynn Dean, 98, American politician, member of the Louisiana State Senate (1996–2004).
Dale Douglass, 86, American golfer (PGA Tour).
Jerome M. Eisenberg, 92, American dealer.
Bryan Marchment, 53, Canadian ice hockey player (San Jose Sharks, Edmonton Oilers, Chicago Blackhawks).
Royce W. Murray, 85, American chemist.
Jacob Nena, 80, Micronesian politician, president (1997–1999) and vice president (1991–1996), governor of Kosrae (1979–1983).
Mihăiță Nițulescu, 53, Romanian boxer, stroke.
Arnaldo Pambianco, 86, Italian Olympic racing cyclist (1956).
Achim Stadler, 60, German Olympic cyclist (1984).
William Tobin, 68, British-New Zealand astronomer.
Tricia, 65, Vietnamese-born Australian Asian elephant.
İlter Türkmen, 94, Turkish diplomat and politician, minister of foreign affairs (1980–1983).
Ira Valentine, 59, American football player (Houston Oilers), heart attack.
Norah Vincent, 53, American journalist and author (Self-Made Man), assisted suicide.
Ing-Marie Wieselgren, 64, Swedish psychiatrist, stabbed.
Hans Wortmann, 72, Dutch computer scientist (University of Groningen).

7
Waldo Rubén Barrionuevo Ramírez, 54, Bolivian Roman Catholic prelate, auxiliary bishop (2014–2019) and vicar apostolic (since 2019) of Reyes.
János Berecz, 91, Hungarian politician, MP (1985–1990).
Mike Brito, 87, Cuban-American baseball scout (Los Angeles Dodgers).
Dewey Brundage, 90, American football player (Pittsburgh Steelers).
Peter Burwash, 77, Canadian tennis player, coach, and commentator.
Chen Jialin, 79, Chinese television director (Wu Zetian, Tang Ming Huang, Kangxi Dynasty).
Barbara Delaplace, 69, Canadian author.
Max Eisen, 93, Slovak-Canadian author and Holocaust survivor.
George Elder, 101, American baseball player (St. Louis Browns).
Pedro Ferrándiz, 93, Spanish basketball coach (Real Madrid, national team).
Ian Glynn, 94, British biologist.
Marco Goldschmied, 78, British architect.
Robert Halbritter, 92, American judge and politician, member of the West Virginia House of Delegates (1966–1971).
Kris Hansen, 52, American politician, member of the Montana House of Representatives (2011–2015).
R. C. Harvey, 85, American cartoonist and comics historian, complications from a fall.
Donald Nuechterlein, 97, American diplomat.
Ian Oliver, 82, Scottish police officer, chief constable of Central Scotland Police (1979–1990) and Grampian Police (1990–1998).
Walter Pierce, 91, American impresario.
José Ramírez Gamero, 84, Mexican politician, deputy (1976–1988, 1997–2003) and governor of Durango (1986–1992).
Shambu Tamang, 70, Nepalese mountaineer, cancer.
Adam Wade, 87, American singer ("The Writing on the Wall") and television host (Musical Chairs), complications from Parkinson's disease.
Phil Walker, 67, English footballer (Boavista, Millwall, Charlton Athletic).
Cornell Webster, 67, American football player (Seattle Seahawks).
Jimmy Williams, 43, American football player (San Francisco 49ers, Seattle Seahawks).
Rod Zaine, 76, Canadian ice hockey player (Pittsburgh Penguins, Buffalo Sabres, Chicago Cougars).

8
Shinzo Abe, 67, Japanese politician, prime minister (2006–2007, 2012–2020) and MP (since 1993), shot.
Sharmili Ahmed, 75, Bangladeshi actress (Meherjaan), cancer.
Marta Aura, 82, Mexican actress.
Denis Brière, 76, Canadian forester and academic administrator.
Robin Dalton, 101, Australian literary agent, film producer and memoirist.
Athanasios Dimitrakopoulos, 86, Greek politician, MP (1981–1996).
George Jonathan Dodo, 65, Nigerian Roman Catholic prelate, bishop of Zaria (since 2000).
José Eduardo dos Santos, 79, Angolan politician, president (1979–2017), complications from cardiac arrest and COVID-19.
Luis Echeverría, 100, Mexican politician, president (1970–1976) and secretary of the interior (1963–1969).
Hugh Evans, 81, American Hall of Fame basketball referee (NBA).
Fan Haifu, 88, Chinese crystallographer, member of the Chinese Academy of Sciences.
Yvon Garlan, 88, French historian and academic.
Beth Gott, 99, Australian plant physiologist.
Michael Edward John Gore, 86, British diplomat, governor of the Cayman Islands (1992–1995).
Gregory Itzin, 74, American actor (24, The Mentalist, Lincoln), complications from surgery.
Alam Khan, 78, Bangladeshi composer ("Ore Neel Doriya Amay De Re De Chhariya", "Hayre Manush Rangin Phanush").
Angel Lagdameo, 81, Filipino Roman Catholic prelate, bishop of Dumaguete (1989–2000) and archbishop of Jaro (2000–2018).
Harry Mowbray, 75, Scottish footballer (Blackpool, Bolton Wanderers, Cowdenbeath).
Bob Parsons, 72, American football player (Chicago Bears).
Alan Pope, 76, Canadian politician, Ontario MPP (1977–1990), complications following heart surgery.
Tony Sirico, 79, American actor (The Sopranos, Goodfellas, Wonder Wheel).
Donnie "Beezer" Smith, 97, American child actor (Our Gang).
Larry Storch, 99, American actor (F Troop, Tennessee Tuxedo and His Tales, The Great Race).

9
Ljiljana Bakić, 82–83, Serbian architect.
Paul Dear, 55, Australian footballer (Hawthorn), pancreatic cancer.
John Gwynne, 77, British darts commentator (Sky Sports), cancer.
Ted Hunt, 102, British waterman, Queen's Bargemaster (1978–1990).
Tommy Jacobs, 87, American golfer.
L. Q. Jones, 94, American actor (The Wild Bunch, Hang 'Em High) and film director (A Boy and His Dog).
Matt King, 37, American visual artist, co-founder of Meow Wolf.
Diarmuid McCarthy, 66, Irish Gaelic footballer (Naomh Abán, Muskerry).
Wim Quist, 91, Dutch architect (Eindhoven Water Towers, Museon, Beelden aan Zee).
Davie Robb, 74, Scottish footballer (Aberdeen, national team).
Lily Safra, 87, Brazilian-Monegasque art collector and philanthropist.
Alois Schätzle, 96, German politician, member of the Landtag of Baden-Württemberg (1971-1988).
Ann Shulgin, 91, American writer (PiHKAL, TiHKAL).
Adam Strachan, 35, Scottish footballer (Partick Thistle, Ross County, Clyde).
B. K. Syngal, 82, Indian telecommunications executive.
Barbara Thompson, 77, English jazz saxophonist (Colosseum, Manfred Mann's Earth Band, Keef Hartley Band), complications from Parkinson's disease.
Bernard Toone, 65, American basketball player (Philadelphia 76ers, Latte Matese Caserta, Gaiteros del Zulia), cancer.
András Törőcsik, 67, Hungarian footballer (Újpesti Dózsa, Montpellier, national team), pneumonia.
Wanderley Vallim, 85, Brazilian entrepreneur and politician, governor of the Federal District (1990–1991).

10
Theodore Aranda, 87, Belizean politician, MP (1979–1984, 1989–1993, 1998–2003).
Ken Armstrong, 63, English footballer (Kilmarnock, Southampton, Birmingham City).
Andrew Ball, 72, British pianist.
Correlli Barnett, 95, English military historian.
Michael Barratt, 94, English television presenter (Nationwide).
Maurice Boucher, 69, Canadian biker (Hells Angels) and convicted murderer, throat cancer.
Gil Burford, 98, American ice hockey player (Michigan Wolverines).
Anvar Chingizoglu, 60, Azerbaijani historian and ethnologist.
Cho Jung-hyun, 52, South Korean footballer (Yugong Elephants, Jeonnam Dragons, national team), pancreatic cancer.
Francis X. Clines, 84, American journalist (The New York Times).
Ermano Batista Filho, 84, Brazilian lawyer and politician, Minas Gerais MLA (1991–2007), traffic collision.
Hans Frauenfelder, 99, Swiss-born American biophysicist.
Hirohisa Fujii, 90, Japanese economist and politician, minister of finance (1993–1994, 2009–2010) and MP (1977–1986, 1990–2012).
Chantal Gallia, 65, Algerian-born French singer and humorist, stroke.
Noah Eli Gordon, 47, American poet.
Enamul Haque, 85, Bangladeshi museologist.
Warren Kitzmiller, 79, American politician, member of the Vermont House of Representatives (since 2001), complications from a stroke.
Gerald McEntee, 87, American trade unionist, president of AFSCME (1981–2012).
Noel McMahen, 95, Australian footballer (Melbourne).
Bjørn Inge Mo, 54, Norwegian politician, member of the Sámi Parliament of Norway (2017–2020).
Nelson Pinder, 89, American civil rights activist.
Marcel Rémy, 99, Swiss mountaineer and rock climber.
Juan Roca Brunet, 71, Cuban basketball player, Olympic bronze medalist (1972).
Barry Sinclair, 85, New Zealand cricketer (Wellington, national team).
Ján Solovič, 88, Slovak writer, playwright and politician, member of the Slovak National Council (1971–1990).

11
Víctor Benítez, 86, Peruvian footballer (Boca Juniors, Milan, national team).
Shirley Cotton, 87, Australian Olympic discus thrower (1956).
David Dalton, 80, British-born American author and editor (Rolling Stone).
Natalya Donchenko, 89, Russian speed skater, Olympic silver medalist (1960).
Jimmie Lou Fisher, 80, American politician, treasurer of Arkansas (1981–2003).
Pat Courtney Gold, 83, American Wasco Native basket weaver, fiber artist and mathematician.
José Guirao, 63, Spanish cultural manager and art expert, minister of culture (2018–2020), director of Reina Sofía Museum (1994–2001) and deputy (2019–2020), cancer.
Erik Hornung, 89, Latvian-born German Egyptologist.
Sean Kelly, 81, Canadian humorist and writer (National Lampoon, Heavy Metal), heart and renal failure.
Diana Lebacs, 74, Curaçaoan writer, pancreatic cancer.
Wolf Liebeschuetz, 95, German-born British historian.
Terence Macartney-Filgate, 97, British-born Canadian film director (Fields of Endless Day, Dieppe 1942, Timothy Findley: Anatomy of a Writer) and cinematographer.
Joseph Mittathany, 90, Indian Roman Catholic prelate, bishop of Tezpur (1969–1980) and archbishop of Imphal (1980–2006).
Gary Moeller, 81, American football coach (Illinois Fighting Illini, Michigan Wolverines, Detroit Lions).
Monty Norman, 94, English composer ("James Bond Theme").
Judith Schiff, 84, American archivist.
Ducky Schofield, 87, American baseball player (St. Louis Cardinals, Pittsburgh Pirates, San Francisco Giants).
Johannes Willms, 74, German historian and journalist (Süddeutsche Zeitung).

12
Tony Binarelli, 81, Italian magician and television personality.
Donald Card, 93, South African police officer and politician, mayor of East London.
Francisco Contreras, 88, Mexican tennis player.
Michael Cowan, 89, English cricketer (Yorkshire).
John Elliott, 83, New Zealand politician, MP (1975–1981).
Vicente Fialho, 84, Brazilian politician, deputy (1991–1995), COVID-19.
Sir Michael Fowler, 92, New Zealand architect and politician, mayor of Wellington (1974–1983).
Ivo Fürer, 92, Swiss Roman Catholic prelate, bishop of Saint Gallen (1995–2005), complications from Parkinson's disease.
Bobby Hill, 100, American motorcycle racer.
Séamus Hughes, 69, Irish judge and politician, TD (1992–1997).
Avdhash Kaushal, 87, Indian social worker and academic.
Ville Kurki, 54, Finnish Olympic sailor (1996).
Philip Lieberman, 87, American cognitive scientist.
Joan Lingard, 90, Scottish author (The Kevin and Sadie series).
Colm McGurk, 55, Northern Irish hurler and Gaelic footballer (Lavey).
Zahia Mentouri, 74–75, Algerian physician and government official, minister of health and social affairs (1992).
Lekeaka Oliver, 53, Cameroonian separatist leader (Ambazonia Self-Defence Council), shot.
T. R. Prasad, 80, Indian civil servant.
Tõnu Saar, 77, Estonian actor (Inquest of Pilot Pirx, Metskannikesed, Curse of Snakes Valley).
Chris Stuart, 73, British journalist (Western Mail), producer (Only Connect), and songwriter.
Bramwell Tovey, 69, British conductor (Vancouver Symphony Orchestra, Rhode Island Philharmonic Orchestra) and composer (Eighteen), sarcoma.
Andrew Watson, 95, British Army officer, general officer commanding Eastern District (1977–1980). 
Jan Wijn, 88, Dutch pianist and pedagogue.
Dave Wintour, 77, British bass guitarist (The Wurzels) and session musician, cancer.
Xu Xurong, 100, Chinese physicist, member of the Chinese Academy of Sciences.
Christoph-Michael Zeisner, 78, German Olympic sport shooter (1972, 1976).

13
Arturo Alessandri Besa, 98, Chilean politician, MP (1973, 1990–1998).
Rashard Anderson, 45, American football player (Carolina Panthers), pancreatic cancer.
Gaston Bouatchidzé, 86, Georgian-French writer and translator.
Mario Chella, 88, Italian politician, deputy (1983–1987).
Bruce Cliffe, 75, New Zealand politician, MP (1990–1996).
A. B. Crentsil, 78, Ghanaian singer, composer and guitarist.
Kerry J. Donley, 66, American politician, mayor of Alexandria, Virginia (1996–2003).
Bobby East, 37, American racing driver (NASCAR Craftsman Truck Series), stabbed.
Wajih Fanous, 74, Lebanese literary critic.
Mark Fleischman, 82, American businessman (Studio 54), assisted suicide.
John Froines, 83, American chemist and civil rights activist (Chicago Seven), complications from Parkinson's disease.
Michael James Jackson, 77, American music producer (Kiss, L.A. Guns), complications from COVID-19 and pneumonia.
Anna Jakubowska, 95, Polish World War II combatant and community activist.
Tanveer Jamal, 62, Pakistani actor, television director and producer, cancer.
Pat John, 69, Canadian actor (The Beachcombers).
Sixtus Lanner, 88, Austrian politician, MP (1971–1996).
Antti Litja, 84, Finnish actor (The Year of the Hare, The Clan – Tale of the Frogs, Farewell, Mr. President).
James M. McCoy, 91, American USAF non-commissioned officer, chief master sergeant of the air force (1979–1981).
Carlos Quintana, 71–72, Argentine trade unionist and politician, deputy (2005–2009).
Rubina Qureshi, 81, Pakistani classical singer, cancer.
Howard Slusher, 85, American attorney and sports agent.
Colin Stubs, 81, Australian tennis player and promoter, pancreatic cancer.
Charlotte Valandrey, 53, French actress (Red Kiss, In the Shadow of the Wind, Tomorrow Is Ours) and author, complications from heart surgery.
Spencer Webb, 22, American college football player (Oregon Ducks), cliff diving accident.
Dieter Wedel, 83, German television director (Hamburg Transit, Schwarz Rot Gold, Die Affäre Semmeling).

14
Bobby Aylward, 67, Irish politician, TD (2007–2011, 2015–2020).
Helen Rose Dawson, 94, American religious sister and college administrator, complications from a stroke.
Christian Doermer, 87, German actor (No Shooting Time for Foxes, Oh! What a Lovely War) and director.
Kazi Ebadul Haque, 86, Bangladeshi judge.
Jürgen Heinsch, 82, German football player and coach, Olympic bronze medallist (1964).
Thomas H. Kapsalis, 97, American painter and sculptor.
Jak Knight, 28, American comedian, television writer and actor (Big Mouth, Bust Down, Black-ish), suicide by gunshot.
Nikolai Krogius, 91, Russian chess grandmaster.
Germano Longo, 89, Italian actor (Guns of the Black Witch, The Revenge of Spartacus, Twenty Thousand Dollars for Seven).
Abdul Azeez Madani, 72, Indian Islamic scholar.
Kevin McMahon, 92, Australian footballer (North Melbourne).
Tamara Metal, 88, Israeli Olympic high and long jumper (1952) and basketball player (national team).
Sylvia Molloy, 83, Argentine writer.
Francisco Morales-Bermúdez, 100, Peruvian politician and general, president (1975–1980), prime minister (1975) and minister of economy (1968–1974).
Abdullah Ommidvar, 89, Iranian-Chilean movie director and producer (Johnny 100 Pesos).
Erica Pedretti, 92, Swiss artist.
Ramai Ram, 78, Indian politician, Bihar MLA (1972–1977, 1980–2015).
Eugenio Scalfari, 98, Italian journalist (L'Espresso), deputy (1968–1972) and co-founder of La Repubblica.
Viktor Slesarev, 72, Russian football player (SKA-Khabarovsk) and manager (Zvezda Perm, SOYUZ-Gazprom Izhevsk).
Pleun Strik, 78, Dutch footballer (PSV Eindhoven, NEC Nijmegen, national team).
Clem Tisdell, 82, Australian economist.
Ann Trotter, 90, New Zealand historian.
Ivana Trump, 73, Czech-American businesswoman, author, and model, fall.
William Van der Pol, 84, Dutch-born Canadian Olympic water polo player (1972).
Albert Vann, 87, American politician, member of the New York State Assembly (1975–2001) and New York City Council (2002–2013).
Carleton Varney, 85, American interior designer.

15
Raymond Audi, 89, Lebanese banker.
Frans Baert, 96, Belgian lawyer and politician.
José Ramón Balaguer, 90, Cuban politician, minister of health (2006–2010).
Ellen Carlson, 93, American newspaper columnist (St. Paul Pioneer Press).
Arthur Day, 88, Australian cricketer (Victoria).
Francesco De Lucia, 88, Italian lawyer and politician, mayor of Bari (1981–1990).
Terry Fulton, 92, Australian footballer (Geelong).
Bill Greensmith, 91, English cricketer (Essex).
Lourdes Grobet, 81, Mexican photographer.
Knut Korsæth, 90, Norwegian politician, county governor of Oppland (1981–2001) and sports official.
Aleksandr Kozlov, 29, Russian footballer (Spartak Moscow, Ararat Yerevan), blood clot.
*Luiz of Orléans-Braganza, 84, Brazilian aristocrat, disputed head of the imperial family (since 1981).
Meng Zhaozhen, 89, Chinese landscape architect, member of the Chinese Academy of Engineering.
Patrick Michaels, 72, American climatologist and climate change denier.
Alice Pauli, 100, Swiss gallery owner, sculptor and artist.
Pratap Pothen, 70, Indian film director (Rithubhedam) and actor (Thakara, Chamaram).
Paul Ryder, 58, English bassist (Happy Mondays).
Adolf Stein, 91, German Olympic sailor (1956).
Neil Vipond, 92, Canadian-American actor (Phobia, Kings and Desperate Men, Paradise) and stage director.
Howard N. Watson, 93, American watercolor painter.
Georgi Yartsev, 74, Russian football player (Spartak Moscow, Soviet Union national team) and manager.

16
Ángela Abós Ballarín, 87, Spanish politician, member of Aragonese cortes (1991–1999).
Georgs Andrejevs, 89, Latvian politician, minister of foreign affairs (1992–1994) and MEP (2004–2009).
Elly Appel-Vessies, 69, Dutch tennis player.
Brian Bailey, 89, English Olympic sport shooter (1972).
Egil Bakke, 94, Norwegian civil servant, director of the Norwegian Competition Authority (1983–1995).
Mary Ellin Barrett, 95, American writer.
Ricky Bibey, 40, English rugby league player (Wigan Warriors, Leigh Centurions, Wakefield Trinity), heart attack.
Hobie Billingsley, 94, American Hall of Fame diving coach (Indiana Hoosiers).
Francisco Cumplido, 91, Chilean lawyer and politician, minister of justice (1990–1994).
Georgios Daskalakis, 86, Greek politician, MP (1981–1996, 2000–2004).
Herbert W. Franke, 95, Austrian scientist and writer.
José Guadalupe Galván Galindo, 80, Mexican Roman Catholic prelate, bishop of Ciudad Valles (1994–2000) and Torreón (2000–2017).
Paul Hannam, 50, Canadian Olympic sailor (1996).
Dee Hock, 93, American businessman, founder of Visa Inc..
Nirmal Singh Kahlon, 79, Indian politician, Punjab MLA (2007–2012).
Ken Kennedy, 81, Irish rugby union player (London Irish, British & Irish Lions).
Mark Nye, 76, American politician, member of the Idaho House of Representatives (2014–2016) and Senate (since 2016).
Carlos Pérez de Bricio, 94, Spanish businessman and politician, minister of industry (1975–1977).
Idris Phillips, 64, American musician and composer.
Sean Quilty, 56, Australian Olympic runner (1996), cancer.
Mickey Rooney Jr., 77, American actor (Hot Rods to Hell, Honeysuckle Rose).
Gerald Shargel, 77, American attorney, complications from Alzheimer's disease.
José Manuel Vela Bargues, 60, Spanish economist and politician, Valencian minister of finance (2011–2012).
Vira Vovk, 96, Ukrainian-born Brazilian writer, critic and translator.
Wakanohana Kanji II, 69, Japanese sumo wrestler and yokozuna, lung cancer.
Brad White, 63, American football player (Tampa Bay Buccaneers, Indianapolis Colts, Minnesota Vikings).

17
Enam Ali, 61, Bangladeshi-born British businessman, founder of The British Curry Awards and Spice Business Magazine, cancer.
Ada Ameh, 48, Nigerian actress (Phone Swap, Òlòtūré, The Johnsons).
Billy Davies, 86, Welsh cricketer (Glamorgan).
Jessie Duarte, 68, South African politician, cancer.
Eric Flint, 75, American author (1632) and editor.
Phillip Geissler, 48, American physical chemist.
Ilona Graenitz, 79, Austrian politician, MP (1986–1995) and MEP (1995–1999).
Watson Khupe, 59, Zimbabwean politician, senator (2018–2022).
Kim Chong-kon, 91, South Korean admiral and diplomat, chief of naval operations (1979–1981) and ambassador to Taiwan (1981–1985).
Erden Kıral, 80, Turkish film director and screenwriter (On Fertile Lands, Hunting Time, The Blue Exile), intracranial bleed.
Joyce Laing, 83, Scottish art therapist.
David Moberg, 78, American journalist, complications from Parkinson's disease.
Kemi Nelson, 66, Nigerian politician. 
César Pedroso, 75, Cuban pianist (Los Van Van, Pupy y Los que Son, Son).
Jack Reid, 79, American politician, member of the Virginia House of Delegates (1990–2008).
Francesco Rizzo, 79, Italian footballer (Cagliari, Fiorentina, national team).
Richard D. Simons, 95, American politician.
Héctor Tricoche, 66, Puerto Rican salsa singer-songwriter.
Yang Fujia, 86, Chinese nuclear physicist, president of Fudan University (1993–1998) and chancellor of the University of Nottingham (2001–2013).

18
Xavier Amorós Solà, 99, Spanish writer and poet, senator (1986–1993).
Maya Attoun, 48, Israeli visual artist, complications from surgery.
Rebecca Balding, 73, American actress (Soap, Charmed, Makin' It), ovarian cancer.
Booker Brown, 69, American football player (San Diego Chargers).
Egidio Caporello, 91, Italian Roman Catholic prelate, bishop of Mantua (1986–2007).
Ottavio Cinquanta, 83, Italian sports administrator, president of the ISU (1994–2016) and member of the IOC (1996–2008).
Dani, 77, French actress (Day for Night, Love on the Run, Guy) and singer.
Vincent DeRosa, 101, American hornist.
José Diéguez Reboredo, 88, Spanish Roman Catholic prelate, bishop of Osma-Soria (1984–1987), Ourense (1987–1996) and Tui-Vigo (1996–2010), stroke. 
Povl Dissing, 84, Danish singer and guitarist.
Delia Giovanola, 96, Argentine human rights activist, co-founder of the Grandmothers of the Plaza de Mayo.
Bajram Haliti, 67, Serbian Romani author.
Hans-Joachim Hespos, 84, German composer.
Larry Jeffrey, 81, Canadian ice hockey player (Detroit Red Wings, Toronto Maple Leafs, New York Rangers).
Anwar Hussain Laskar, 58, Indian politician, Assam MLA (1996–2006).
Don Mattera, 86, South African poet and writer.
Raja Mukherjee, 71, Indian cricketer (Bengal).
Claes Oldenburg, 93, Swedish-born American sculptor.
Tony Ongarello, 89, Australian footballer (Fitzroy).
Françoise Riopelle, 95, Canadian choreographer.
Aloyzas Sakalas, 91, Lithuanian politician, MP (1990–2004), MEP (2004–2009) and signatory of the Act of the Re-Establishment of the State of Lithuania.
Bhupinder Singh, 82, Indian ghazal singer.
Nikola Štedul, 84, Croatian independence activist and assassination target.
Jane Woods, 75, American politician, member of the Virginia House of Delegates (1988–1992) and Senate (1992–2000).

19
Stuart Chapman, 71, English footballer (Port Vale, Stafford Rangers, Macclesfield Town).
Tommy Collins, Irish filmmaker (Kings, The Gift, Penance), cancer. (death announced on this date)
Vicky Conway, 42, Irish academic and police reform activist.
Jim Dillard, 83, American gridiron football player (Calgary Stampeders, Ottawa Rough Riders, Toronto Argonauts).
Eunice Durham, 90, Brazilian anthropologist.
Maxime Feri Farzaneh, 93, French-Iranian writer and filmmaker.
Steve Gibbons, 72, Australian politician, MP (1998–2013).
Versand Hakobyan, 71, Armenian oligarch and politician, MP (2007–2012).
Michael Henderson, 71, American bass guitarist (Miles Davis) and vocalist.
Henkie, 76, Dutch singer.
Angela Jacobs, 53, American journalist and anchor (WFTV), breast cancer.
Charles Johnson, 50, American football player (Pittsburgh Steelers, Philadelphia Eagles, New England Patriots).
Nigel Konstam, 89, British sculptor and art historian.
Joan F. López Casasnovas, 69, Spanish Catalan language philologist, teacher and politician, member of the Balearic parliament (1983–1992).
Igor López de Munain, 38, Spanish politician, member of the Basque parliament (2012–2016).
George McGrath, 79, Irish jockey.
Ajay Kumar Parida, 58, Indian biologist, cardiac arrest.
Jack Parry, 90, English footballer (Derby County).
Ruslana Pysanka, 56, Ukrainian actress (Moskal-Charivnyk, With Fire and Sword, Rzhevsky Versus Napoleon) and cinematographer, cancer.
Q Lazzarus, 61, American singer ("Goodbye Horses").
William Richert, 79, American filmmaker (Winter Kills) and actor (My Own Private Idaho, The Client).
Kevin Rooney, 71, American comedian, television writer and producer (My Wife and Kids, Politically Incorrect, 'Til Death), complications from diabetes and renal failure.
Richard Seal, 86, English organist and conductor.
Allen Spraggett, 90, Canadian paranormal writer and broadcaster.
Charles L. Waddell, 90, American politician, member of the Senate of Virginia (1972–1998).

20
Barbara Breit, 84, American tennis player.
Bill Burbach, 74, American baseball player (New York Yankees).
Rex Crawford, 90, American-born Canadian politician, MP (1988–1997).
Barry Downs, 92, Canadian architect.
Sir Kenneth Eaton, 87, British admiral, controller of the Navy (1989–1994).
Alan Grant, 73, Scottish comic book writer (Judge Dredd, Lobo, Batman).
Alice Harnoncourt, 91, Austrian violinist (Concentus Musicus Wien).
Peter Inge, Baron Inge, 86, British military officer, chief of the general staff (1992–1994), chief of the defence staff (1994–1997) and constable of the Tower (1996–2001).
Phil Jackson, 90, English rugby league player (Barrow Raiders, Great Britain, national team).
Henry Janzen, 82, Canadian football player (Winnipeg Blue Bombers) and coach (Manitoba).
Alan M. Kent, 55, English writer (Surfing Tommies).
Kamoya Kimeu, 83–84, Kenyan paleontologist and curator, kidney failure.
Jolán Kleiber-Kontsek, 82, Hungarian discus thrower, Olympic bronze medalist (1968).
Bernard Labourdette, 75, French road racing cyclist.
Douglas Mitchell, 83, Canadian football player (BC Lions) and CFL commissioner (1984–1988).
Stephen Milosz, 66, Australian cricketer (Western Australia, Tasmania).
Stephen G. Olmstead, 92, American lieutenant general.
Luis Omedes, 84, Spanish Olympic rower (1952) and luger (1968).
Miguel Pérez Villar, 77, Spanish politician, senator (1991–1993).
Judith Stamm, 88, Swiss politician, member (1983–1999) and president (1996–1997) of the National Council.
Viktor Žmegač, 93, Croatian musicologist and scholar.

21
An An, 35, Chinese-born giant panda, euthanised.
Taurean Blacque, 82, American actor (Hill Street Blues, DeepStar Six, Savannah).
Marcus Blunt, 75, British composer.
Shlomo Carlebach, 96, German-born American Haredi rabbi and scholar.
Justin Crawford, 45, Australian footballer (Sydney Swans, Hawthorn).
Marjorie Crocombe, 92, Cook Islands author and academic.
Milan Dvořák, 87, Czech footballer (Spartak Praha Stalingrad, Dukla Prague, Czechoslovakia national team).
Johnny Egan, 83, American basketball player (Detroit Pistons, Baltimore Bullets) and coach (Houston Rockets), fall.
Paddy Hopkirk, 89, British rally driver.
Martti Lehtevä, 91, Finnish Olympic boxer (1960).
Jim Lynch, 76, American Hall of Fame football player (Notre Dame Fighting Irish, Kansas City Chiefs), Super Bowl champion (IV).
Gustavo López Davidson, 60–61, Salvadoran politician and businessman, leader of the Nationalist Republican Alliance (2019–2020).
Reino Paasilinna, 82, Finnish politician, MEP (1996–2009), complications from Parkinson's disease.
Vytautas Paukštė, 90, Lithuanian actor (Northern Crusades, ...And Other Officials, Rafferty).
Nikola Radmanović, 53, Serbian footballer (Red Star Belgrade, Mérida).
Perry Rubenstein, 68, American gallerist. 
Jörg Schmidt, 61, German sprint canoeist, Olympic silver medalist (1988).
Michel Schneider, 78, French writer and musicologist.
Uwe Seeler, 85, German footballer (Hamburger SV, West Germany national team).
Luca Serianni, 74, Italian linguist, traffic collision.
Rodney Stark, 88, American religious sociologist and author (The Rise of Christianity, The Rise of Mormonism).

22
Robert Boutigny, 94, French sprint canoeist, Olympic bronze medalist (1948).
Emilie Benes Brzezinski, 90, Swiss-American sculptor.
Kieran Crotty, 91, Irish politician, TD (1969–1989).
Frankie Davidson, 88, Australian singer.
Núria Feliu, 80, Spanish singer and actress, complications from a stroke.
Heikki Haavisto, 86, Finnish politician, minister for foreign affairs (1993–1995).
Joseph Hazelwood, 75, American sailor, complications of cancer and COVID-19. (death announced on this date)
Ryoichi Honda, 82, Japanese politician, member of the House of Councillors (1998–2004).
Arnold E. Kempe, 95, American politician, member of the Minnesota House of Representatives (1975–1978).
Nanda Khare, 75, Indian writer.
Peter Lübeke, 69, German footballer (Hamburger SV, 1. FC Saarbrücken).
Fazle Rabbi Miah, 76, Bangladeshi politician.
David Moores, 76, British football executive, chairman of Liverpool (1991–2007).
Kenichi Ōkuma, 57, Japanese video game music composer (Langrisser V: The End of Legend, Super Smash Bros. Brawl), esophageal cancer.
Maria Petri, 82, English football supporter.
Leon E. Rosenberg, 89, American geneticist, physician and educator, dean of the Yale School of Medicine (1984–1991).
Dwight Smith, 58, American baseball player (Chicago Cubs, Atlanta Braves), World Series champion (1995), heart and lung failure.
Stefan Soltész, 73, Hungarian-Austrian conductor.
Aleksey Vdovin, 59, Russian-Moldovan water polo player, Olympic bronze medalist (1992).
Stuart Woods, 84, American author (Chiefs, Run Before the Wind, New York Dead).

23
Boy Alano, 81, Filipino actor (Sa Bilis Walang Kaparis, James Batman, Juan & Ted: Wanted).
Venant Bacinoni, 82, Burundian Roman Catholic prelate, bishop of Bururi (2007–2020).
Peter Boyle, 71, Scottish epidemiologist.
Con Britt, 74, Australian footballer (Collingwood).
Paul Coker, 93, American illustrator (Mad) and animation production designer (Frosty the Snowman, Santa Claus Is Comin' to Town).
Ronald S. Dancer, 73, American politician, member of the New Jersey General Assembly (since 2002).
Robert Dutton, 71, American politician, member of the California State Assembly (2002–2004) and Senate (2004–2012), cancer.
Rinus Ferdinandusse, 90, Dutch writer and journalist.
Don Gehrmann, 94, American Olympic runner (1948).
Vitaliy Gulyaev, 44, Ukrainian military officer, airstrike.
Diane Hegarty, 80, American satanist, co-founder of the Church of Satan.
Jerry Holan, 91, American Olympic swimmer (1952).
Sid Jacobson, 92, American comic book writer (Richie Rich, Casper the Friendly Ghost, Hot Stuff the Little Devil), stroke complications from COVID-19.
*Kyaw Min Yu, 53, Burmese writer and political activist, execution by hanging.
Aaron Latham, 78, American journalist and screenwriter (Urban Cowboy, Perfect, The Program).
Gerald Nagler, 92, Swedish businessman and human rights activist.
Nguyễn Xuân Vinh, 92, Vietnamese aerospace engineer and military officer, commander of the South Vietnam Air Force (1958–1962).
Mike Pela, 72, British record producer and mixing engineer, Grammy winner (2002).
Billy Picken, 66, Australian footballer (Collingwood, Sydney Swans).
Bob Rafelson, 89, American film director (Five Easy Pieces, The Postman Always Rings Twice) and television producer (The Monkees).
Bhisadej Rajani, 100, Thai royal.
Robin Reed, 65, American cell biologist.
Gloria Stoll Karn, 98, American pulp cover artist and illustrator.
Julio Valdez, 66, Dominican baseball player (Boston Red Sox).
*Zayar Thaw, 41, Burmese politician and rapper, MP (2012–2016, 2016–2021), execution by hanging.

24
Janina Altman, 91, Polish-Israeli chemist and Holocaust survivor.
Kevin Beahan, 89, Irish Gaelic footballer (St Mary's).
Steve Beaird, 70, American-born Canadian football player (Winnipeg Blue Bombers).
Carla Cassola, 74, Italian actress (Captain America, Where Are You? I'm Here, The Butterfly's Dream) and composer.
Thomas C. Creighton, 77, American politician, member of the Pennsylvania House of Representatives (2001–2013).
Joseph Dan, 87, Israeli scholar of Jewish mysticism.
Alain David, 90, Luxembourgian-born French Olympic sprinter (1956).
Tamar Eshel, 102, British-born Israeli politician, MK (1977–1984).
Rose Furigay, Filipino politician, mayor of Lamitan (2013–2022), shot.
Tim Giago, 88, American journalist (Indian Country Today, Rapid City Journal) and founder of the Native American Journalists Association.
Charles Godfrey, 104, American-born Canadian physician and politician, Ontario MPP (1975–1977).
Neil Hague, 72, English footballer (Rotherham United, Plymouth Argyle, AFC Bournemouth).
Lotte Ingrisch, 92, Austrian author.
Diana Kennedy, 99, British food writer (The Cuisines of Mexico).
Michael R. Long, 82, American politician, member of the New York City Council (1981–1983).
Sam McCrory, 57, Northern Irish loyalist (Ulster Defence Association) and convicted paramilitary, fall.
Chase Mishkin, 85, American theatre producer (Memphis).
Len Oliver, 88, American soccer player (Uhrik Truckers, Ludlow Lusitano, Baltimore Pompei), complications from a stroke.
Kurt Pfammatter, 81, Swiss Olympic ice hockey player (1964).
Charlotte Pomerantz, 92, American author.
Win Remmerswaal, 68, Dutch baseball player (Boston Red Sox).
Berta Riaza, 94, Spanish actress (Ten Ready Rifles, Entre Tinieblas).
Mncedisi Shabangu, 53, South African actor (Hijack Stories, Catch a Fire, Vaya), playwright and theatre director.
David Warner, 80, English actor (The Omen, Tron, Titanic), Emmy winner (1981), complications from lung cancer.
McKinley Washington Jr., 85, American politician, member of the South Carolina House of Representatives (1975–1990) and Senate (1990–2000).
Sir William Wright, 94, Northern Irish bus manufacturer (Wrightbus) and politician, member of the constitutional convention (1975–1976).

25
Jennifer Bartlett, 81, American visual artist.
John Bienenstock, 85, Hungarian-born Canadian physician.
Geir Børresen, 79, Norwegian actor (Sesam Stasjon).
John Duggan, 93, English rugby union (Wakefield) and league (Wakefield Trinity) player.
Martin How, 90, English composer and organist.
Irina Ionesco, 91, French photographer.
Ashok Jagdale, 76, Indian cricketer (Madhya Pradesh).
Agha Syed Hamid Ali Shah Moosavi, 82, Pakistani Islamic scholar.
Tatyana Moskvina, 63, Russian columnist, writer, and actress (His Wife's Diary, Gisele's Mania).
Bridget Namiotka, 32, American pairs skater.
Marit Paulsen, 82, Norwegian-born Swedish journalist and politician, MEP (1999–2004, 2009–2014).
Hartmut Perschau, 80, German politician and soldier, MEP (1989–1991).
Tom Poberezny, 75, American Hall of Fame aerobatic pilot.
Sandy Roberton, 80, British record producer (Hark! The Village Wait, Please to See the King, Ten Man Mop, or Mr. Reservoir Butler Rides Again).
Herb Roedel, 83, American football player (Oakland Raiders).
Yoko Shimada, 69, Japanese actress (Shōgun, Castle of Sand, Kaze, Slow Down), colorectal cancer.
Knuts Skujenieks, 85, Latvian writer and poet.
Song Zhaosu, 81, Chinese politician, governor of Gansu (1999–2001).
Paul Sorvino, 83, American actor (Goodfellas, The Rocketeer, Law & Order).
Milenko Stefanović, 92, Serbian classical and jazz clarinetist.
Richard Tait, 58, Scottish-born American board game designer (Cranium), complications from COVID-19.
Lucio Tasca, 82, Italian winemaker and Olympic equestrian (1960).
David Trimble, Baron Trimble, 77, Northern Irish politician, first minister (1998–2002), MP (1990–2005) and member of the House of Lords (since 2006), Nobel Prize laureate (1998).
Bruce Williams, 83, Australian footballer (Carlton).

26
Inger Alfvén, 82, Swedish author and sociologist.
Ronald Allison, 90, British journalist and press secretary (Queen Elizabeth II).
Sushovan Banerjee, 84, Indian physician, West Bengal MLA (1984–1989), kidney disease.
Jannette Burr, 95, American Olympic alpine skier (1952).
Daniel Cardon de Lichtbuer, 91, Belgian banker, president of Bank Brussels Lambert (1992–1996).
Clive Coates, 80–81, British wine writer.
Iosif Culineac, 80, Romanian Olympic water polo player (1964, 1972).
Branko Cvejić, 75, Serbian actor (Grlom u jagode, The Elusive Summer of '68, Balkan Express).
Eli N. Evans, 85, American author, complications from COVID-19.
Bruno Foresti, 99, Italian Roman Catholic prelate, archbishop of Modena-Nonantola (1976–1983) and archbishop ad personam of Brescia (1983–1998).
Anne-Marie Garat, 75, French novelist, cancer.
Paul Garon, 80, American writer and blues historian.
Darío Gómez, 71, Colombian singer.
David Ireland, 94, Australian author (The Unknown Industrial Prisoner).
Sy Johnson, 92, American jazz composer, arranger and pianist, COVID-19.
Tomohiro Katō, 39, Japanese mass murderer (Akihabara massacre), execution by hanging.
Chin Kung, 95, Chinese Buddhist monk, pneumonia.
Oleksandr Kukurba, 27, Ukrainian military officer.
James Lovelock, 103, English environmentalist (Gaia hypothesis), inventor of the electron capture detector, complications from a fall.
Lukas Lundin, 64, Swedish-Canadian mining industry executive, chairman of Lundin Mining (2006–2022), brain cancer.
Abbas Ali Mandal, Bangladeshi politician, MP (1986–1988).
Lael Morgan, 86, American author, journalist and historian.
Alfred Moses, 45, Canadian politician, Northwest Territories MLA (2011–2019).
Giorgio Oppi, 82, Italian politician, deputy (2006–2009).
Uri Orlev, 91, Polish-born Israeli children's author (The Island on Bird Street) and translator.
Aldo Pastore, 91, Italian politician, deputy (1979–1987).
William Phillips, 78, Australian Olympic water polo player (1964).
J. Deotis Roberts, 95, American theologian.
Balwinder Safri, 63, Indian singer.
Laurie Sawle, 96, Australian cricket player (Western Australia) and selector.
Felix Thijssen, 88, Dutch author.
Nick Tredennick, 75, American inventor, ATV accident.
Inez Voyce, 97, American baseball player (South Bend Blue Sox, Grand Rapids Chicks).
Jean Westwood, 91, British-Canadian figure skater, cancer.

27
Mary Alice, 85, American actress (Fences, A Different World, The Matrix Revolutions), Tony winner (1987).
Paul Émile Joseph Bertrand, 97, French Roman Catholic prelate, auxiliary bishop of Lyon (1975–1989) and bishop of Mende (1989–2001).
Luis Morgan Casey, 87, American Roman Catholic prelate, auxiliary bishop of La Paz (1983–1988) and apostolic vicar of Pando (1988–2013).
Bernard Cribbins, 93, English actor (The Wombles, Doctor Who) and singer ("The Hole in the Ground").
Yelizaveta Dementyeva, 94, Russian sprint canoer, Olympic champion (1956).
Tony Dow, 77, American actor (Leave It to Beaver, Never Too Young) and television director (Coach), complications from liver cancer.
John Gayler, 79, Australian politician, MP (1983–1993).
John Grenell, 78, New Zealand country singer.
Dieter Helm, 81, German farmer and politician, MP (1990) and MdL (1990–2009).
Dorothy Hollingsworth, 101, American educator.
JayDaYoungan, 24, American rapper, shot.
Larry Josephson, 83, American radio host (WBAI), programmer, and engineer, complications from Parkinson's disease.
Inez Kingi, 91, New Zealand health advocate.
Ardhendu Kumar Dey, 81, Indian politician, Assam MLA (1991–2006).
Gisèle Lalonde, 89, Canadian politician, mayor of Vanier, Ontario (1985–1992).
Burt Metcalfe, 87, Canadian-born American actor (Father of the Bride, Gidget) and television producer (M*A*S*H).
Sir Christopher Meyer, 78, British diplomat, Downing Street press secretary (1993–1996), ambassador to the United States (1997–2003) and Germany (1997), stroke.
Mick Moloney, 77, Irish-American musician and folklorist.
Joseph F. Murphy Jr., 78, American judge, Maryland Court of Appeals (2007–2011).
Pak To-chun, 78, North Korean politician.
Les Rothman, 95, American basketball player (Chicago American Gears, Syracuse Nationals).
Celina Seghi, 102, Italian Olympic alpine skier (1948, 1952).
Ron Sider, 82, Canadian-born American theologian and social activist, heart attack.
Tom Springfield, 88, English musician (The Springfields) and songwriter ("I'll Never Find Another You", "Georgy Girl").
Abdullahi Ali Ahmed Waafow, Somali general and politician, MP and mayor of Merca.
Edwin Wilson, 79, Australian poet.

28
Pauline Bewick, 86, English-born Irish artist, cancer.
Franco Casalini, 70, Italian basketball coach (Olimpia Milano).
Pietro Citati, 92, Italian writer and literary critic.
Jason Di Tullio, 38, Canadian soccer player (Montreal Impact) and manager, brain cancer.
Wayne Hawkins, 84, American football player (Oakland Raiders).
Gil Hayes, 82, Canadian wrestler (All-Star Wrestling, Stampede Wrestling).
Yaakov Heruti, 95, Israeli political activist and convicted terrorist, founder of the Kingdom of Israel.
İlhan İrem, 67,  Turkish singer and songwriter, kidney failure.
József Kardos, 62, Hungarian footballer (Újpesti Dózsa, national team).
Rodney Melland, 84, American curler (1971 world championship bronze medalist).
Terry Neill, 80, Northern Irish football player (national team) and manager (Arsenal, Tottenham Hotspur).
Walter D. Reed, 98, American Air Force major general.
Howard Rosenthal, 83, American political scientist.
Roger H. Stuewer, 87, American historian.
Péter Szőke, 74, Hungarian tennis player, complications from a stroke.
Jim Trelease, 81, American author, complications from Parkinson's disease.
William White, 56, American football player (Detroit Lions, Kansas City Chiefs, Atlanta Falcons), complications from amyotrophic lateral sclerosis.

29
Hans Bangerter, 98, Swiss football administrator, general secretary of UEFA (1960–1989).
Sybille Benning, 61, German politician, MP (2013–2021).
Jean Bobet, 92, French road bicycle racer.
Myra Butter, 97, English aristocrat.
Phil Carlson, 70, Australian cricketer (Queensland, national team).
Jerome Ceppos, 75, American journalist and newspaper editor, sepsis.
Emmie Chanika, 66, Malawian human rights activist, stroke.
Rasik Dave, 65, Indian actor (Eeshwar, Masoom, Straight), kidney failure.
Margot Eskens, 82, German Schlager singer.
Juris Hartmanis, 94, Latvian-American computer scientist.
Mamoun Hassan, 84, Saudi-born British screenwriter (The Good Life, Machuca), director and producer (No Surrender).
Knud J. V. Jespersen, 80, Danish historian.
Olga Kachura, 52, Ukrainian pro-Russian separatist, missile strike.
Yuri Kobishchanov, 87, Russian Africanist and sociologist.
Lee Seng Tee, 99, Singaporean businessman and philanthropist.
Susan M. Levin, 50, American dietitian.
John Loder, 3rd Baron Wakehurst, 96, British hereditary peer, member of the House of Lords (1970–1999).
John Mackin, 78, Scottish football player (Northampton Town, York City, Corby Town) and manager.
Arthur Malcolm, 87, Australian Anglican prelate.
Clarence E. McKnight Jr., 92, American lieutenant general.
Julian Nava, 95, American educator and diplomat, ambassador to Mexico (1980–1981).
Mary Obering, 85, American painter.
Michael Redfern, 79, British actor (The Newcomers, United!, The Two Ronnies).
Tom Richmond, 72, American cinematographer (Stand and Deliver, House of 1000 Corpses, Nick & Norah's Infinite Playlist).
Samuel Sandoval, 98, American Navajo code talker.
Adrian Thorne, 84, English footballer (Brighton & Hove Albion, Plymouth Argyle, Exeter City).
Zhang Xingqian, 100, Chinese metal physicist, member of the Chinese Academy of Sciences.

30
George Bartenieff, 89, German-American actor (Hercules in New York, See No Evil, Hear No Evil, Cookie).
Pat Carroll, 95, American actress (The Little Mermaid, The Danny Thomas Show, Caesar's Hour), Emmy winner (1957), complications from pneumonia.
Anne Eisenhower, 73, American interior designer.
Mike Filey, 80, Canadian historian and radio host.
Don Hammond, 85, New Zealand rugby league player (Auckland, national team).
Mike Johnson, 78, American politician, member of the Oklahoma Senate (1998–2010), complications from hip surgery.
Kiyoshi Kobayashi, 89, Japanese voice actor (Humanoid Monster Bem, Lupin the Third, Death Note), pneumonia.
Martin Luluga, 89, Ugandan Roman Catholic prelate, auxiliary bishop (1986–1990) and bishop (1990–1999) of Gulu and bishop of Nebbi (1999–2011).
Sadanand Mohol, 83, Indian cricketer (Maharashtra, West Zone, Indian Starlets), cardiac arrest.
Nichelle Nichols, 89, American actress (Star Trek, Truck Turner, Snow Dogs), heart failure.
Roberto Nobile, 74, Italian actor (La scuola, Everybody's Fine, First Light of Dawn).
John Rensenbrink, 93, American political activist, founder of Maine Green Independent Party.
Archie Roach, 66, Australian musician and singer-songwriter ("Took the Children Away").
Yitzchok Tuvia Weiss, 95, Slovak-born British-Israeli Haredi rabbi, head of the Edah HaChareidis (since 2004).
Alvin Yeo, 60, Singaporean politician, MP (2006–2015), cancer.

31
Vadim Bakatin, 84, Russian politician and intelligence officer, minister of internal affairs (1988–1990) and chairman of the KGB (1991).
David Cannan, 85, Manx politician, MHK (1982–2011).
Carole Caroompas, 76, American painter. 
Vasile Silvian Ciupercă, 73, Romanian politician, deputy (2000–2004).
Hubert Coppenrath, 91, French Polynesian Roman Catholic prelate, coadjutor archbishop (1997–1999) and archbishop (1999–2011) of Papeete.
Terry Davies, 88, Australian Olympic rower (1960, 1964).
Mónica Domínguez Blanco, 38, Spanish journalist, cancer.
Joseph A. Doorley Jr., 91, American politician, mayor of Providence, Rhode Island (1965–1975).
Anneli Drummond-Hay, 84, Scottish show jumper.
Jack Fellure, 90, American perennial political candidate.
Maria Frisé, 96, German journalist and author.
Cécile Gallez, 86, French politician, deputy (2002–2010) and mayor of Saint-Saulve (1977–2020).
Zulma Gómez, 61, Paraguayan politician, senator (since 2008) and deputy (2003–2008), drowned.
A. Jean de Grandpré, 100, Canadian lawyer and businessman, chancellor of McGill University (1984–1991).
Diane Haigh, 73, British architect.
Hartmut Heidemann, 81, German footballer (MSV Duisburg, West Germany national team).
Herb Henderson, 91, Australian footballer (Footscray).
Abdul Lateef A. Hussein, 75, Nigerian physicist and academic administrator, vice chancellor of Lagos State University (2005–2011).
Khalid Ibrahim, 75, Malaysian politician, menteri besar of Selangor (2008–2014), MP (2008–2018) and Selangor MLA (2008–2018).
Christophe Izard, 85, French television producer (L'île aux Enfants, Albert the Fifth Musketeer).
Charles L. Keyser, 92, American Episcopalian bishop.
Hubertus Leteng, 63, Indonesian Roman Catholic prelate, bishop of Ruteng (2009–2017), heart attack.
Nirmala Mishra, 83, Indian playback singer (Malajahna, Adina Megha), heart attack.
Brian Molloy, 91, New Zealand plant ecologist, conservationist, and rugby union player (Manawatu, Canterbury, national team).
Ian Nish, 96, British academic.
Mo Ostin, 95, American Hall of Fame record executive (Warner Bros. Records, Reprise Records, Verve Records).
T. Mohandas Pai, 89, Indian business executive and philanthropist, founder of Udayavani. 
Fidel V. Ramos, 94, Filipino military officer and politician, president (1992–1998), secretary of national defense (1988–1991) and chief of the staff (1984–1988), COVID-19.
Brajagopal Roy, 86, Indian politician, Tripura MLA (1978–1983, 1993–1998).
Bill Russell, 88, American Hall of Fame basketball player and coach (Boston Celtics, Seattle SuperSonics, Sacramento Kings), Olympic champion (1956).
Valero Serer, 89, Spanish footballer (Mestalla, Zaragoza, Gimnàstic).
Sara Shane, 94, American actress (The King and Four Queens, Tarzan's Greatest Adventure, 'Magnificent Obsession').
Frederick L. Stackable, 86, American politician, member of the Michigan House of Representatives (1971–1974).
John Steiner, 81, English actor (Hine, Violent Rome, Yor, the Hunter from the Future), traffic collision.
Iimura Takahiko, 85, Japanese filmmaker and fine artist.
Oleksiy Vadaturskyi, 74, Ukrainian entrepreneur, founder of Nibulon, shelling.
Ayman al-Zawahiri, 71, Egyptian Islamic militant, emir of the Egyptian Islamic Jihad (1991–1998), emir (since 2011) and deputy emir (1988–2011) of al-Qaeda, airstrike.

References

2022-7
7